Sarbat da bhala (Punjabi: ਸਰਬੱਤ ਦਾ ਭਲਾ ; sarabata dā bhalā) is the final term in the Sikh prayer called the Ardas. The term outlines one of the most important of Sikh principles and is a point that is repeated in the Sikh Scriptures. The Sikh concept of sarbat da bhala which means "blessings for everyone" or literally "may everyone prosper". This statement is repeated by all practising Sikhs at least twice daily as part of their Nitnem (daily prayers). This concept is central to Sikhism and forms a very important and essential role in the religious philosophy of the Sikh Gurus.

The Ardas ends with the line:

To put this in very concise and clear language, the term invokes the Sikh to request, pray and ask the Almighty for the well-being of all of humanity, prosperity for everyone (regardless of religion) in the worldwide community, global peace for the entire planet.

A Sikh selflessly prays daily for "all to prosper"'. This gesture comes from the clear and pure teaching of Gurbani (Sri Guru Granth Sahib) and forms the Gurmat code of conduct. Gurbani tells us that there are "no others", "there is only One". The same "One God resides within all". We are "all the children of that One God". As the potter makes pots of different forms and colors from the same basic clay; and as the goldsmith moulds jewellery of various types, colors and shapes from the same single homogeneous material, gold; similarly, we are all born of the same One Light: "There is no difference".

Accordingly, by instruction from the Gurus, the true Sikh begs for "the good for all beings" of the world. Because he knows that within every one of us resides the same One God – the Sikh should realise that he is "one with the rest".

References

Sikh scripture
Sikh prayer